Live in Japan is an album by the country rock band the New Riders of the Purple Sage.  It was recorded from August 25 to August 29, 1993 at Club Citta in Kawasaki, the Bottom Line in Nagoya, and Banana Hall in Osaka.  It was released by Relix Records on September 27, 1994.

Live in Japan includes performances of three Grateful Dead songs — "Dire Wolf", "Ripple", and "Friend of the Devil".

Track listing
"Henry" (John Dawson) – 4:16
"Dire Wolf" (Jerry Garcia, Robert Hunter) – 3:41
"Rainbow" (Dawson) – 4:07
"Early in the Morning" (traditional) – 9:50
"Keep On Keepin' On" (Dawson) – 6:02
"Ripple" (Garcia, Hunter) – 6:20
"I Don't Know You" (Dawson) – 3:47
"Friend of the Devil" (Garcia, Dawson, Hunter) – 5:35
"Portland Woman" (Dawson) – 12:58

Personnel

New Riders of the Purple Sage
John Dawson – acoustic guitar,  harmonica, vocals
Rusty Gauthier – electric guitar, acoustic guitar, violin, vocals
Gary Vogensen – electric guitar, vocals

Production
Rusty Gauthier – producer, mixing
Carolyn Gauthier – recording
Evana Gerstman – graphic art and design
John Dawson, Elanna Wyn Ellis – cover concept
Sadayoshi Sukegawa – photographs

Notes

New Riders of the Purple Sage live albums
1994 live albums
Relix Records live albums